This is a list of Mexican films released in 2012.

References

External links

List of 2012 box office number-one films in Mexico

2012
Films
Mexican